Mørkefjord, meaning in Danish "The dark fjord," is a fjord in King Frederick VIII Land, northeastern Greenland.

History
Mørkefjord was named by the 1906-1908 Denmark expedition, which established a second weather station at Mørkefjord, in order to compare meteorological observations data with those taken at Danmarkshavn . It had also been known as Vigfusdalfjord.

The 1938–1939 Mørkefjord expedition was named after it. They built their base hut and repaired their ship "Gamma" at a place by the fjord's shores.

There are remains of Inuit sites at the mouth of the fjord.

Geography
This fjord is located east of Danmarkshavn in Daniel Bruun Land. There are two parallel fjords close to it, Hellefjord to the south, and Sælsøen, a lake with a fjord structure, to the north. It runs from east to west for about 30 km. There is a small branch on its southern shore. Kalvenø island is located off its mouth in northern Dove Bay.

Bibliography
Spencer Apollonio, Lands That Hold One Spellbound: A Story of East Greenland, 2008

See also
List of fjords of Greenland

References

External links
Den grønlandske Lods - Geodatastyrelsen

Fjords of Greenland